Mossana Debesai (born 25 November 1993) is an Eritrean professional racing cyclist, who last rode for UCI Women's Team . She competed in the women's road race event at the 2020 Summer Olympics.

She rode in the women's road race at the 2016 UCI Road World Championships. In 2019, she won the African Road Championships road race and in 2018 and the African Road Championships individual time trial. She is the younger sister of Mekseb Debesay who won the men's competition in both events.

Major results

2014
 National Road Championships
2nd Time trial
3rd Road race
2015
 African Games
1st  Time trial
5th Road race
 1st  Time trial, National Road Championships
 African Road Championships
3rd  Team time trial
7th Time trial
10th Road race
2016
 1st  Time trial, National Road Championships
 African Road Championships
3rd  Team time trial
5th Time trial
2017
 African Road Championships
1st  Team time trial
2nd  Time trial
7th Road race
 1st  Time trial, National Road Championships
2018
 African Road Championships
1st  Time trial
2nd  Team time trial
3rd  Road race
2019
 African Road Championships
1st  Road race
2nd  Team time trial
4th Time trial
 African Games
2nd  Team time trial
7th Time trial
 National Road Championships
3rd Time trial
3rd Road race

References

External links
 

1993 births
Living people
Eritrean female cyclists
Sportspeople from Asmara
African Games gold medalists for Eritrea
African Games medalists in cycling
Competitors at the 2015 African Games
Olympic cyclists of Eritrea
Cyclists at the 2020 Summer Olympics